Theatre Peckham is a community theatre in Peckham, London. The theatre has operated since the 1990s and was originally based in the community hall adjoining the former Camberwell Town Hall .  The theatre company Theatre Peckham have operated out of the venue on  Havil street , since 1992 and was repurposed as a fully refurbished theatre when the town hall was rebuilt in 2016. It’s core values are based on working “to dispel the myth that ‘The Arts’ are only for a privileged few” a line which featured in the ‘ what is NPV’ section of 1990s annual reports.

Though the name and venue has changed many times over the years, the focus for thearte Peckham since 1986 has always been rooted for the community. In doing so, the theatre group , formally new Peckham varieties, have been providing low rate classes and productions in order to provide for the local community , and includes John Boyega among its alumni.

The theatre is now currently run by Artistic Director & CEO Suzann McLean.

History

St Luke’s and the New Peckham varieties

Move to Havil Hall

The magic eye theatre

New Building

National theatre connections

Patrons

Awards

References

External links
Official website

Community theatre
Peckham
Theatres in the London Borough of Southwark